Wolaitta or  Wolayttatto Doonaa is a North Omotic language of the Ometo group spoken in the Wolayita Zone and some other parts of the Southern Nations, Nationalities, and People's Region of Ethiopia. It is the native language of the Welayta people. The estimates of the population vary greatly because it is not agreed where the boundaries of the language are.

There are conflicting claims about how widely Wolaytta is spoken. Some hold that Melo, Oyda, and Gamo-Gofa-Dawro are also dialects, but most authorities, including Ethnologue and ISO 639-3 now list these as separate languages. The different communities of speakers also recognize them as separate languages. A variety called Laha is said to be 'close' to Wolaytta in Hayward (1990) but listed as a distinct language by Blench; however, it is not included in Ethnologue.

Wolaytta has existed in written form since the 1940s, when the Sudan Interior Mission first devised a system for writing it. The writing system was later revised by a team led by Dr. Bruce Adams. They finished the New Testament in 1981 and the entire Bible in 2002. It was one of the first languages the Derg selected for their literacy campaign (1979–1991), before any other southern languages. Welaytta pride in their written language led to a fiercely hostile response in 1998 when the Ethiopian government distributed textbooks written in Wegagoda – an artificial language based on amalgamating Wolaytta with several closely related languages. As a result the textbooks in Wegagoda were withdrawn and teachers returned to ones in Wolaytta.

In speaking their language, the Wolaytta people use many proverbs. A large collection of them, in Ethiopian script, was published in 1987 (Ethiopian calendar) by the Academy of Ethiopian Languages. Fikre Alemayehu's 2012 MA thesis from Addis Ababa University provides an analysis of Wolaytta proverbs and their functions.

Lexical similarity with
Gamo 79% to 93%
Gofa 84%
Dawro 80%
Kullo 80%
Dorze 80%
Koorete 48%
Male 43%

Language status
The language is the official language in the Wolayita Zone of Ethiopia. Portions of the Bible were produced in 1934, the New Testament in 1981, and the entire Bible in 2002.

Phonology

Consonants
Wakasa (2008) gives the following consonant phonemes for Wolaytta. (He also has , but these are consonant clusters, .) Items in  show the Latin alphabet, where this differs from the IPA:

Two consonants require further discussion.  The sound written  is described by Wakasa (2008:44) as a 'nasalized glottal fricative'; it is said to be extremely rare, occurring in only one common noun, an interjection, and two proper names.  The status of the sound written  is apparently in dispute; Adams (1983:48) and Lamberti and Sottile (1997:23, 25-26) claim that it is implosive, thus presumably .  Wakasa (2008:62) denies that this consonant is implosive, and calls it 'glottalized'. (See implosive for more on such discrepancies.)

Vowels

Wolaytta has five vowels, which appear both long and short:

Grammar

Word order
Like other Omotic languages, the Wolaytta language has the basic word order SOV (subject–object–verb), as shown in the following example (Wakasa 2008:1041):

It has postpositional phrases, which precede the verb (Wakasa 2008:1042):

Nouns used adjectivally precede the nouns that they modify (Wakasa 2008:1044)

Numerals precede the nouns that they quantify over (Wakasa 2008:1045)

See also
 Welayta people

Further reading
Adams, Bruce A. 1983. A Tagmemic Analysis of the Wolaitta Language. Unpublished PhD. thesis, University of London.
Adams, Bruce A. 1990. Name nouns in Wolaitta. In Omotic Language Studies ed. by Richard Hayward, 406-412. London: School of Oriental and African Studies.
Amha, Azeb. 2001. Ideophones and compound verbs in Wolaitta. In Ideophones. Typological Studies in Language, ed. by  Voeltz, F.K. Erhard and Christa Kilian-Hatz, 49-62. Amsterdam - Philadelphia: John Benjamins.
Amha, Azeb. 2010. Compound verbs and ideophones in Wolaitta revisited. In Complex Predicates: Cross-Linguistic Perspectives on Event Structure, ed. by Mengistu Amberber, Brett Baker and Mark Harvey, 259-290. Cambridge: Cambridge University Press.
Amha, Azeb. 2001. Wolaitta. In Facts about the World Languages, an Encyclopedia of the Worlds Major Languages, Past and Present, ed. by J. Garry and C. Rubino, ed., 809-15. New York - Dublin: H.W. Wilson.
Amha, Azeb, 1996. Tone-accent and prosodic domains in Wolaitta. In Studies in African Linguistics 25(2), pp. 111–138.
Lamberti, Marcello and Roberto Sottile. 1997. "The Wolaytta Language". In Studia Linguarum Africae Orientalis 6: pp. 79–86. Cologne: Rüdiger Köppe.
Ohman, Walter and Hailu Fulass. 1976. Welamo. In Language in Ethiopia, ed. by M. L. Bender, C. Bowen, R. Cooper, and C. Ferguson, pp. 155–164. Oxford University Press.
Wakasa, Motomichi. 2008. A Descriptive Study of the Modern Wolaytta Language. Ph.D. thesis. University of Tokyo.

References

External links

 World Atlas of Language Structures information on Wolaytta
  Collection of Wolaytta proverbs with Amharic translations

Languages of Ethiopia
North Omotic languages